Saurauia adenodonta is a species of plant in the Actinidiaceae family. It is endemic to Ecuador.  Its natural habitats are subtropical or tropical moist lowland forests and subtropical or tropical moist montane forests. It is threatened by habitat loss.

References

Endemic flora of Ecuador
adenodonta
Near threatened plants
Taxonomy articles created by Polbot
Taxa named by Hermann Otto Sleumer